St. Joseph's College is a national school located in Bandarawela, Uva, Sri Lanka.  It is also known as Bandarawela St. Joseph's National School.  Established in 1909, the school provides primary and secondary education to students in the Badulla District.

The campus occupies  on a section of Badulla Road which is part of the A16 highway.

History
In 1909, St. Joseph's School was established by the De La Salle Brothers.  Seventeen boys were admitted on the first day. The first principal was an Irishman, Patrick Purchell, known as Brother Simon Mathew.  However, the land on which the school was situated was sold in 1914.

The land was repurchased in 1928 by the Marist Brothers.  In this second stage, the first principal was known as the Reverend Brother Lewis.  By the time of his departure in 1934, there were 250 students.

St. Joseph's remained a private school until 1961, when it became a government school.  The first principal under the new system was Arthur Deegalle.

In 1974, the primary section was added and girls were admitted, making it a mixed school.  In 1981, the school was recognised as a National School by the Ministry of Education, and it was graded a 1 AB school in 1999.

Organisation
The principal is the head of the administration of the college and is assisted by a Vice Principal.
The school is divided into three sections: the primary school (the former St. Joseph's College Preparatory School), middle school and the upper school, each coming under a deputy principal.

The college educates close to 3,000 students.

Activities

Houses
St. Joseph's College assigns its students to one of four houses to encourage cooperation and friendly competition:
   Blue House
  Gold House
 Green House
  Maroon House

Annually, the college organizes inter-house athletic games to improve
the athletic skills of the students as well as their team spirit.

Sports

Battle of the Golds Uva
St. Joseph's College has a standing rivalry with Bandarawela Central College and have engaged in an annual cricket match titled the "Battle of the Golds Uva" since 1996.  This is a revival of an older tradition of competition between these two schools that had been dormant since 1972.

Principals

References

External links

 
 

National schools in Sri Lanka
Schools in Bandarawela
Educational institutions established in 1909
1909 establishments in Ceylon